Anton Källberg (born 17 August 1997) is a Swedish table tennis player.

He represented his country at the 2020 Summer Olympics in Tokyo.

Career

2021 
Källberg won his opening round of 64 match in the men's singles event with a convincing 4–0 win over USA's Nikhil Kumar.

2022
He won a bronze medal in the men's doubles alongside Jon Persson at the 2022 European Table Tennis Championships.

References 

1997 births
Living people
Swedish male table tennis players
Table tennis players at the 2020 Summer Olympics
Olympic table tennis players of Sweden
World Table Tennis Championships medalists
20th-century Swedish people
21st-century Swedish people